Rosehaven is an Australian television comedy series created and written by Celia Pacquola and Luke McGregor, who also star in the lead roles.  Its name derives from the fictional small town in rural Tasmania in which it is set. Premiering on 12 October 2016 on ABC TV, the series finished after its fifth season on 22 September 2021.

The second season began airing on 25 October 2017. The third season began on 30 January 2019. The fourth season began airing on 8 July 2020. The show was renewed for a fifth and final season in January 2021, which went to air from 4 August 2021.

Plot
Daniel returns to his hometown in Tasmania, fictional "Rosehaven", to help his mother, Barbara, run the family real estate business. His friend Emma turns up after her honeymoon doesn't work out.  The series draws its inspiration from McGregor's parents, who have worked in real estate in Tasmania since 1986.

Cast
 Luke McGregor as Daniel McCallum
 Celia Pacquola as Emma Dawes
 Kris McQuade as Barbara McCallum
 Katie Robertson as Grace
 David Quirk as Damien
 Kim Knuckey as Greg
 Noela Foxcroft as Mrs Marsh
 Sam Cotton as Bruce
 Susie Youssef as Gez
 Anthony Morgan as Phil

Recurring and guest appearances
 Stephen Hunter as John (Season 1)
 Gabrielle Adkins as Olive (Seasons 1-5)
 Georgina Naidu as Jocelyn (Season 2, 4)
 Tony Briggs as Brian (Season 3)
 Tracy Mann as Karina (Season 3)
 Norman Coburn as Gareth (Season 3)
 Debra Lawrance as Sandra (Season 3)
 Geneviève Picot as Jenny (Season 3)
 Shareena Clanton as Suzanne (Season 3)
 Dustin Clare as Farmer Dan (Season 3)
 Leah Vandenberg as Harleen (Season 3)
 Jack Charles as Duncan (Season 3)
 John Xintavelonis as Joe (Season 4)
 Alicia Gardiner as Julie (Season 4)
 Josh Quong Tart as Donovan (Season 4, 5)
 Bonnie Sveen as Jacquelyn (Season 4)
 Dennis Coard as John (Season 4)
 Louise Siversen as Kerry (Season 4)
 Zahra Newman as Amy (Season 4, 5)
 Nicholas Colla as Ryan (Season 4)
 Morgana O'Reilly as Pen (Season 4)
 Geraldine Hickey as Pippa (Season 4)
 Ben Winspear as Sam (Season 4, 5)
 Pamela Rabe as Margaret (Season 5)
 Vivienne Awosoga as Lena (Season 5)
 Katrina Milosevic as Jana (Season 5)

Episodes

Series 1 (2016)

Series 2 (2017)

Series 3 (2019)

Series 4 (2020)

Series 5 (2021)

Viewership

Series 1 (2016)

Series 2 (2017)

Series 3 (2019)

Series 4 (2020)

Series 5 (2021)

Broadcast
Internationally, the series was acquired by SundanceTV in the United States.

Home video releases
The first series was released on DVD on 7 December 2016. The second series was released on DVD on 13 December 2017. The third series was released on DVD on 20 March 2019.

Awards and nominations

References

External links
 
 Rosehaven on Facebook

Australian Broadcasting Corporation original programming
Australian comedy television series
2016 Australian television series debuts
2016 in Australian television
Television shows set in Tasmania
English-language television shows
Fictional populated places in Australia
2021 Australian television series endings